The Schottmalhorn is a mountain in the Steinernes Meer on the border of Bavaria, Germany and Salzburg, Austria.

References

Mountains of the Alps
Mountains of Bavaria
Mountains of Salzburg (state)
Berchtesgaden Alps